The Golden State is the third studio album by rap group N2Deep. The album was released in 1997 on Swerve Records and was produced by Johnny Z, Jay Tee, Funk Daddy, Ken Franklin and Dave G. Four singles were included on the album: "Day 2 Day Basis", "Threesome", "Parkin' Lot Pimpin'" and "Cali Lifestyles".  Guests on the album include Baby Beesh, Mary Jane Girls, Mac Dre, Dru Down and PSD.

Track listing
"Intro"- 2:00 
"Day 2 Day Basis"- 4:33 
"Threesome" (featuring PSD & Mac Lee)- 3:34 
"On Tha' Everyday" (featuring Mary Jane Girls & Ironic)- 4:28 
"Where We Dwell" (featuring Mac Dre & Baby Beesh)- 4:30
"From the Town" (featuring Mac Lee)- 4:12 
"Kick Way on Back" (featuring Baby Beesh)- 4:59 
"Situations"- 4:27 
"Back to the Hotel 2" (Intro by Miami)- 4:43 
"Parkin' Lot Pimpin'" (featuring Levitti, Miami & Baby Beesh and Rube of Potna Deuce)- 5:13 
"Cali Lifestyles" (featuring Dru Down & PSD)- 3:52 
"T-Shirt and Panties" (featuring Baby Beesh & PSD)- 4:00 
"Take a Ride"- 3:47 
"Look Like a Playa"- 4:12 
"Outro"- 1:17

Samples
Day 2 Day Basis
"Feels So Real (Won't Let Go)" by Patrice Rushen
From Tha Town
"Brick House" by Commodores
Situations
"Groove With You" by The Isley Brothers

External links
 [ The Golden State] at Allmusic
 The Golden State at Discogs

N2Deep albums
Jay Tee albums
1997 albums